Brussels Airlines of Belgium serves the following destinations as of November 2100:

List

References

Lists of airline destinations
Star Alliance destinations